Dara Sakor International Airport  is a public use airport in development serving Botum Sakor in Cambodia. It was developed at a cost of $350 million by Chinese-owned Tianjin Union Development Group. The airport will have its first test flights in mid-2023. It will also serve the new Dara Sakor Resort. After a two-year delay, Governor of Koh Kong has announced in a press conference that the airport will be start its operations in mid-2023.

The airport is to serve as the operational base of Lanmei Airlines.

Controversy 
The airport is strategically positioned, located near Cambodia's largest naval base, Ream Naval Base.

The airport's  airstrip is unusually long and can host Chinese military aircraft. Based on 'circumstantial evidence,' the US Department of Defense has raised concern that the airport could be used as a PLA Air Force base, however the airport does not have any infrastructure suggesting military use. In 2020, the US placed sanctions against the airport's developer, claiming it was built on seized land and citing possible Chinese military use. Both Tianjin Union group and the Cambodian government have refuted these claims.

See also 

 List of airports in Cambodia
 Koh Kong Airport

References 

Airports in Cambodia
Koh Kong province